The  2012 AFF U-16 Youth Championship is an international football tournament that was held from 2 June to 8 June 2012, hosted by Laos for the second time.

This year's edition will feature four nations. Laos and Thailand representing the AFF and guests Australia and Japan who are invited as all four nations have qualified for the 2012 AFC U-16 Championship to be played later in the year.  All four teams will play in a round robin group with the top two meeting in a final and the bottom two playing off for 3rd place.

Standings & Results

Group stage

Third place play-off

Final

Winner

Goalscorers
3 goals
 Ryoma Watanabe

2 goals
 Kevin Lap
 Daniel De Silva
 Kento Kawata
 Koji Miyoshi
 Armysay Kettavong

1 goal

 Aaron Calver
 Lawrence Hanna
 Jack Iredale
 Benjamin Warland
 Joshua McDonald
 Hiroaki Aoyama
 Kota Miyamoto
 Koki Sugimori
 Sisawad Dalavong
 Southavone Thammada
 Jo Sandala
 Supravee Miprathang
 Sittichok Kannoo

Own goal
 Jutitep Tonglim (For Laos)

References

Aff
Under
2012
2012
2012 in youth association football